Agustín Ross Park is a park located in the Agustín Ross Avenue, in front of the old Ross Casino, in Pichilemu. It is a National Monument of Chile.

The original park contains 100-year-old native Canary Island Date palms (Phoenix canariensis) and many green spaces. Both the park and the former casino were named National Monuments on February 25, 1988, and the majority of the houses situated in the park are private homes. It has become an attractive walking destination, following its restoration.

The Park was severely damaged after the 2010 Pichilemu earthquake, with all of the balustrades surrounding the park being destroyed.

References 

National Monuments of Chile in Pichilemu
Buildings and structures in Pichilemu
Parks in Chile
Tourist attractions in O'Higgins Region
National Monuments of Chile

es:Pichilemu#Casino y Parque Ross